Cosmopterix kerzhneri is a moth in the family Cosmopterigidae. It was described by Sinev in 1982.

References

Natural History Museum Lepidoptera generic names catalog

Moths described in 1982
kerzhneri